Keays is a surname. Notable people with the surname include:

Ben Keays (born 1997), Australian rules footballer
Fred Keays (born 1900), Australian rules footballer
Jim Keays (born 1946), Australian musician
Peter Keays (born 1955), Australian rules footballer
Russell Keays (1913–1995), Canadian politician
Sara Keays (born 1947), English writer and former mistress of British Conservative politician Cecil Parkinson
Terry Keays (born 1970), Australian rules footballer

See also
Keay